Calle Ilusión is the fourth album from Álex Ubago. Released on March 10, 2009 in Spain, it was nominated for a Latin Grammy Award for Best Male Pop Vocal Album at the 10th Annual Latin Grammy Awards.

Track listing

 Amarrado a Ti (feat. Sharon Corr)
 Me Arrepiento
 Amsterdam
 20 Horas de Nada
 Calle Ilusión
 Ciudad Desierta
 No Estás Sola
 Demasiado Amor
 Mil Horas
 Cerca de Mí
 Como Si Fuera El Último

References

2009 albums
Álex Ubago albums